Asalem (also Romanized as Asālem) is a city and capital of Asalem District, in Talesh County, Gilan Province, Iran.  At the 2006 census, its population was 3,347, in 827 families.
Asalemi dialect is a variety of Talysh

Language 
Linguistic composition of the city.

References

Populated places in Talesh County

Cities in Gilan Province

Talysh settlements in Gilan Province

Gilak settlements in Gilan Province